is a Japanese anime television series based on Sega's Sonic the Hedgehog video game series. Produced by TMS Entertainment under partnership with Sega and Sonic Team, and directed by Hajime Kamegaki, Sonic X initially ran for 52 episodes, broadcasting on TV Tokyo from April 2003 to March 2004. A further 26 episodes aired in North America, Europe, and the Middle East from 2005 to 2006. The American localization and broadcasting were handled by 4Kids Entertainment, which edited it and created new music.

The series follows a group of anthropomorphic animals who accidentally teleport from their home planet to Earth after attempting to save one of their friends from their enemy Doctor Eggman. Separated, Sonic the Hedgehog is saved by a human boy named Chris Thorndyke, who helps him find his friends while repeatedly scuffling with Doctor Eggman and his robots over control of the powerful Chaos Emeralds, and becoming celebrities. The final story arc sees Sonic and his friends return with Chris to their world, where they enter outer space with a newfound plant-like creature named Cosmo and fight an army of aliens called the Metarex.

Sonic X received mixed reviews. Generally, reviewers criticized its American localization and the human characters, but praised its story and animation. The series was popular in the United States and France, though less so in its native Japan. The show's merchandise included an edutainment video game for the Leapster, a trading card game, a comic book series featuring an original storyline, and various toys and other items.

Plot

Season 1 
On an unnamed world, Sonic the Hedgehog, Miles "Tails" Prower, and Amy Rose attempt to rescue Cream the Rabbit and her pet Chao Cheese from the mad scientist Doctor Eggman, who has already retrieved the seven Chaos Emeralds. While attempting to destroy his base, one of Eggman's robots inadvertently shoots a machine containing the Emeralds, which activates the "Chaos Control" technique. This teleports Sonic, Eggman (and his robots), Tails, Amy, Cream, and Cheese, as well as Knuckles the Echidna, Rouge the Bat, Big the Cat (with his pet frog Froggy) and the Chaotix (a detective crew comprising Vector the Crocodile, Espio the Chameleon, and Charmy Bee) to Earth, the parallel-universe version of their world with humans. Sonic is chased by the police in the fictional city of Central City, California, and lands in a mansion's swimming pool, and is rescued by a twelve-year-old boy named Christopher "Chris" Thorndyke, who lives there with his movie-star mother Lindsey, corporate executive father Nelson, scientist grandfather Chuck, maid and chef Ella, and butler Mr. Tanaka. Chris tries to hide the anthropomorphic friends from his family until Cream accidentally reveals them, but they all build up a good rapport with Chris' family and friends Danny, Frances, and Helen (Chris' girlfriend at the end of the series). Doctor Eggman makes himself known by bringing his robot Missile Wrist to attack the city of Station Square in his first stop in taking over Earth which led to his first fight with Sonic there.

Sonic and his friends still want to return home, so they repeatedly scuffle for the Emeralds with Doctor Eggman, his robot assistants—the hyperactive, attention-seeking Bokkun and the bumbling Bocoe and Decoe—and his larger, armed robots. Sonic and Eggman's fight catches the attention of the unnamed nation's president, so Knuckles, Rouge, and federal agent Topaz work together to stop him. The other anthropomorphic residents soon join the crusade and, when Eggman is defeated by Sonic with help from his friends, he is hailed as a hero along with his friends.

Season 2 
Eggman awakens a creature named Chaos from the Master Emerald. The animals fight a losing battle to retrieve the Emeralds until Chaos absorbs all seven and becomes giant in his perfect form, but an echidna girl named Tikal, who entombed herself and Chaos in the Master Emerald millennia ago, emerges to help placate him. After Sonic uses the Chaos Emeralds to become Super Sonic, he defeats Chaos, who returns to the Master Emerald with Tikal.

Shortly afterwards, Eggman finds his grandfather Gerald Robotnik's diary and Gerald's old project Shadow in a military base. After being released by Eggman, Shadow breaks into a museum to steal an Emerald, which gets Sonic arrested. Amy rescues him, but Shadow, Eggman, and the duplicitous Rouge escape to the Space Colony ARK, where Eggman threatens to use a weapon called the Eclipse Cannon to destroy Earth unless they submit to his rule; he blows up half of the Moon to prove his power. Eggman collects the Emeralds to power the Cannon, but this triggers a program Gerald set up decades ago, which will cause Space Colony ARK to hurtle into Earth, destroying the planet in less than half an hour. Gerald did this in order to exact revenge on humanity, who he blamed for the death of his granddaughter Maria after she was killed in a government raid on the Space Colony ARK. Everyone teams up and works together to shut it down except Shadow, who is unsympathetic and believes he has fulfilled his purpose of revenge. Chris confronts Shadow, reminding him of Maria's last wish for Shadow to be a protector of humanity, to guide and aid them. Moved to tears and with a new sense of purpose, Shadow teams up with Sonic and both power up using the Emeralds and teleport the ARK away from Earth, though Shadow is seemingly killed in the process. Sonic, his friends, and Eggman reflect on Shadow's sacrifice and return to Earth. 

Another Chaos Control event brings more animals from Sonic's world to Earth including the Chaotix Detective Agency — Vector the Crocodile, Espio the Chameleon and Charmy Bee, as well as Cream's mother, Vanilla, whom the Chaotix help to reunite with Cream. Eggman rebuilds the Moon, seemingly out of remorse, but its position shifts, creating a solar eclipse, so he manufactures and sells "Sunshine Balls" to replicate sunlight. Sonic sees through his greedy motivations and exposes Eggman who is then arrested for fraud. Bokkun activates a robot named Emerl, who quickly allies with the anthropomorphic people, and Eggman escapes prison. Emerl wins an Emerald in a martial arts tournament involving numerous hero and villain characters, but he goes berserk and begins to wreck the city, forcing Cream and Cheese to destroy him.

Later, two government physicists show up at Chris' mansion to announce that Sonic's world and Earth were once a single world split in two by a cataclysmic event, but are rejoining, which will stop time irreversibly, and the only way to stop it is to send the anthropomorphic people back home. Tails and Chuck begin to build a gate to teleport Sonic and company back to their own world with Chaos Control, but Chris does not want them to leave. When it is finished and all their friends but Sonic have left, Chris suddenly shuts the machine down and whisks Sonic into the woods to hide out of fear his parents will return to never being home once Sonic is gone. Sonic is understanding, yet teaches Chris that as a fellow person neither can force the other to feel a certain way and that their friendship is free will. Chris tearfully acknowledges that he bound Sonic's freedom today and stopped his friend from going back home and remorsefully asks for forgiveness while Sonic tells him he'll be able to be strong even without him being there but promises that they'll see each other again someday. Chris' parents find him and promise to spend more time with him. Chris having learned his lesson and grown as a person goes for one final run with Sonic before they mutually part ways and Sonic returns to his own planet using the Chaos Emeralds and his own Chaos Control, stopping the merging of the worlds caused by Eggman. However, Chris vows that one day, he will see Sonic again.

Season 3 
Six months later, a race of villainous robots known as the Metarex attempt to steal the Emeralds from Sonic, but he scatters them across the galaxy. Meanwhile, on Earth, where six years have passed and Chris is now eighteen, Chris builds another device to travel to Sonic's world where he reunites with Sonic and his friends, but due to the time difference of the 2 worlds, the teleporter reverses his age, making him twelve years old again when he arrives. A sick plant-like girl named Cosmo lands on their planet and they nurse her back to health, so she joins them, and they all board Tails' new spaceship, The Blue Typhoon. On the Typhoon, Sonic and his gang scour the galaxy for the Emeralds and "Planet Eggs" (objects that allow life to flourish on planets, which the Metarex have stolen to depopulate the galaxy) and fight the Metarex at every turn. Along the way, Tails and Cosmo slowly fall in love with each other. Rouge finds Shadow alive in a capsule on Eggman's ship and he is later released (though he has lost his memory). At first, he and Rouge assist Eggman (even saving Chris on one occasion) but after Shadow witnesses the death of resistance fighter who reminded him of Maria, both he and Rouge go off on their own to fight the Metarex independently. Eggman eventually joins the Metarex though this is a ruse to gather more information. After discovering the origins, methods, and goals of the Metarex, Shadow reappears and tries to kill Cosmo, much to Tails' anger. The Metarex's leader, Dark Oak (the powerful robot Sonic fought from the beginning of the third season in super form), appears and reveals that the Metarex and Cosmo are of the same species and that they secretly implanted a tracking device in her brain while extinguishing the rest of their kind; she has been an unwitting spy ever since. It was for this reason Shadow wanted Cosmo dead. Chris, Knuckles, and Tails notice that removing the device will likely destroy her sight and hearing forever. Knuckles pushes for it to be removed anyway (In the Japanese version he stresses to find a way to remove it without damaging her), but Tails cannot make any decisions at the present time so the surgery is called off and the battle against the Metarex continues.

Sonic and his friends, along with Shadow, Rouge and the Chaotix, including Eggman and his henchmen, head to the center of the universe, where the Metarex are ominously controlling a planet that is made of water and contains a Planet Egg where the group engages Metarex in a long fight. After Sonic almost drowns in it, but he manages to free himself by fighting Dark Oak in his dream, but the planet begins turning into a giant seed; the Metarex reveal that, because they have lost the battle, they will destroy the galaxy with this planet. The Metarex then proceed to fuse together, forming a dragon-like plant monster that attaches itself to the giant seed. Sonic and Shadow use the Chaos Emerald to become Super Sonic and Super Shadow but are still unable to defeat the fused Metarex. Cosmo sees a vision from her mother Earthia, telling her that she must sacrifice herself to save the rest. She fuses with the giant seed and instructs Tails to use the Blue Typhoon's cannon to fire Super Sonic and Super Shadow at her and the seed. Tails hesitates, torn between saving the galaxy and killing Cosmo, but eventually finds the inner strength and annihilates the Metarex along with Cosmo, whose seed disperses throughout the galaxy along with the Planet Eggs stolen by the Metarex which return to their original planets. Dark Oak has a moment of repentance before dying while having a vision of being greeted by Earthia as he passes away. Shadow then apparently sacrifices himself to contain the ensuing explosion. After the battle, Sonic reappears and solemnly informs a heartbroken Tails that he could not save Cosmo and hands him one of her seeds. Back on Sonic's planet Eggman builds a device for Chris to return home, later claiming that this was done to reduce the strength of Team Sonic. The series ends with Chris returning home, but not before saying his last goodbye to Sonic, who then, along with his friends, joyfully gears up into business as usual, to once again put a stop to Eggman's schemes. The final shots show Shadow on an alien planet (Japanese version) and Cosmo's seed sprouting in Tails' workshop.

History

Creation and development 

The show was created by TMS Entertainment, the animation subsidiary of Sega Sammy Holdings. It was primarily influenced by other anime rather than work from the West, and was created for a Japanese audience. Yuji Naka, then the head of Sonic Team, filled in as executive producer, and Satoshi Hirayama designed all of the original characters, basing the designs on Yuji Uekawa's original concept. Most of the series consists of original content featuring new as well as established characters, but the second season is mostly based on the plots of Sonic Adventure, Sonic Adventure 2, and Sonic Battle. While traditionally animated, it includes non-outlined CGI elements for things such as Sonic's homing attack.

Two trailers for the series were produced. The first was developed before Cheese had been given a name in Sonic Advance 2 (2002); it referred to Cheese simply as "Chao". It was made up largely of footage that would later appear in the series' intro, but also of unused scenes featuring unique anthropomorphic people. Sega showed off the second, which was narrated in Japanese, at its booth at the World Hobby Fair video gaming event on February 19, 2003. It consisted mostly of scenes from the first few episodes, followed by introductions to the main characters. However, it also showed a still frame of a silver anthropomorphic hedgehog who never appeared in the series. Years later, on April 20, 2015, Sonic Team producer Takashi Iizuka clarified the character was simply Super Sonic in its early contour.

Several of the Japanese performers had voiced their characters in the games, but they were also given ample information about their characters' roles in the anime. Chris' voice actress Sanae Kobayashi was not sure she would be able to effectively communicate Chris' growth as a person owing to Sonic's presence, but found that a worthwhile goal. Chikao Ōtsuka, who voiced Eggman, found him a difficult character to play due to the tension in his voice and the desire to have children who watched the show recognize the character as a villain but not hate him.

Iizuka believed that Sonic X and its merchandise, along with the game Sonic Heroes, had helped expose the Sonic franchise to a new generation of potential gamers in 2003, and he dubbed it a "Sonic Year" as a result. More boldly, Naka hoped that Sonic X alone would cause the popularity of the Sonic series to skyrocket, as that of the Pokémon series did after its anime adaptation was first released.

Broadcast and localization

North America 
4Kids Entertainment handled the show's American localization. The episodes were heavily edited for content and length; 4Kids has been described by Destructoid as being "infamous" among anime fans for this type of overzealous editing. 4Kids removed alcohol consumption, coarse language, instances of breaking the fourth wall, and numerous sexual scenes. Unlike some other series that 4Kids translated around the early to mid 2000s, such as Kirby: Right Back at Ya!, Sonic X suffered no full episodes being cut. Producer Michael Haigney personally disliked realistic violence in children's programs, but had not intended to make massive changes himself. Instead, he was bound by Fox Broadcasting Company's strict guidelines, which forbid content such as smoking and strong violence. In 2006, near the end of the show's American production, Haigney stated in an interview that he had never played a Sonic game, read the comics, or watched any of the previous Sonic animated series.

4Kids found new voice actors rather than using those from the games. 4Kids president Norman J. Grossfeld invited Jason Griffith and Mike Pollock to audition for Sonic and Eggman, having known them from their work on Ultimate Muscle and Kirby: Right Back at Ya! and chose him for his yelling and pitch-wavering talents; Pollock and Griffith also voiced Ella and Shadow. 4Kids allowed Pollock to make minor alterations to the dialogue when lines "[didn't] work for some reason." He recalled being given only short samples of Eggman's voice from the games—he was not told specifically which game—and brief descriptions of his characters' roles. The rest of the cast assumed their characters' voice roles after their auditions. Beginning with Shadow the Hedgehog, the cast of Sonic X would assume their respective voice roles in all Sonic games released between 2005 and 2010, at which point all the roles were recast with the exception of Mike Pollock as Eggman.

Sonic X aired in Japan on TV Tokyo's 8:30 a.m. time slot from April 6, 2003 to March 28, 2004. It consisted of three seasons, each of them 26 half-hour episodes long. In Japan, the third season was never aired on TV until 2020 or released on DVD, but was available through rental streaming services. 4Kids licensed the series in North America from the beginning, ShoPro Entertainment was also made a license holder in November 2003. It aired in North America on the FoxBox block of Fox channels. 

On June 16, 2012, the bankrupt 4Kids sold its Sonic X license to Saban Brands's Kidsco Media Ventures. On April 29, 2013, Saban Brands's Vortexx would partner with Kabillion to add shows like Sonic X to the lineup. Sonic X countinues to broadcast on the network. TMS Entertainment has since taken US rights, and in 2015, Discotek Media licensed the series alongside several other TMS properties for home media releases. In 2021, FilmRise was given the AVOD rights to 38 TMS Entertainment titles including Sonic X for US and Canada.

Internationally 
Outside North America and Asia, Jetix Europe (previously Fox Kids Europe) held the rights to the series, which the company acquired in August 2003. Buena Vista International Television handled television distribution, while Jetix Europe handled all other rights. The company's Jetix Consumer Products subsidiary held consumer rights to the series in Pan-European territories.

The European airings of the series featured a different intro sequence than the North American airings but was otherwise the same as the North American version. The European French dub, was however based on the original Japanese version and was completely uncut.

Asia 
TMS Entertainment handled rights to the series in Asian territories.

Home video

Japan 
The series was released on DVD, in Japan, only seasons one and two were released, and their 52 episodes spanned 13 discs.

United States 
From 2003 to 2009 in the United States, 4Kids Home Video and their exclusive distributor FUNimation Entertainment released VHS tapes (until 2005) and DVDs of the series in single-release volumes and later multi-disc boxsets. The first two to be released were "A Super Sonic Hero" and "The Chaos Factor," released on June 1, 2004.

Another such volume released was "Project Shadow," released on November 15, 2005. It was released to tie in with the release of the game Shadow the Hedgehog, and covered the first arc that focused on Shadow (episodes 33–38).

Discotek Media released the 8-disc DVD set, "Sonic X Collection 1" in North America, which includes the English dubbed seasons 1 and 2 (episodes 1–52) on November 22, 2016. They later released the 4-disc DVD set, "Sonic X Collection 2" in North America, which includes the English dubbed Season 3 (episodes 53–78) on December 6, 2016.

On May 28, 2019, Discotek Media would release a 2-disc Blu-ray set of the English dubbed series with all three seasons and seventy eight episodes. Despite the upgraded format, the series is based on the original 4Kids beta tape, retaining a 480p resolution as opposed to the standard 1080p resolution on most Blu-rays. On October 24, 2022, Discotek announced a subtitled Blu-ray release of the complete series in its original Japanese language. While remastered, the series is still presented in standard definition like the previous release.

Music 
Yoshihiro Ike composed the score for the Japanese version of Sonic X. Its opening theme was "Sonic Drive", performed by Hironobu Kageyama and Hideaki Takatori. The series included three ending themes:  by Run&Gun for episodes 1–13,  by Aya Hiroshige for episodes 14–39 and again for episodes 53–78, and "T.O.P" by KP for episodes 40–52. 4Kids musicians John Angier, Craig Marks, Joel Douek, Louis Cortelezzi, Manny Corallo, Matt McGuire, and Ralph Schuckett, known for their work on the Yu-Gi-Oh! franchise, composed a new background score for the North American release "for both artistic and commercial reasons." The North American opening and closing theme (also used as the closing theme in the European version), titled "Gotta Go Fast," was composed by Grossfeld and his friend Russell Velazquez. A soundtrack titled Sonic X ~Original Sound Tracks~ was released in Japan on March 8, 2004, it consisted of 40 tracks of original music from the first two Seasons.

Other media 
Sonic X was extensively merchandised in various forms of media and other products. Two Game Boy Advance Videos of episodes from the first season of Sonic X were released in May 2004. In October 2004, ShoPro licensed four manufacturers to create Sonic X merchandise, they variously produced items such as toys, bedding, beach towels, backpacks, stationery, and pajamas. Six Sonic X novels were published between 2005 and 2007: Aqua Planet, Dr. Eggman Goes to War, Battle at Ice Palace, and Desperately Seeking Sonic by Charlotte Fullerton, Meteor Shower Messenger by Paul Ruditis, and Spaceship Blue Typhoon by Diana G. Gallagher.

Comic series 

Archie Comics, which published Sonic the Hedgehog comics until 2017, started a Sonic X series in 2005. It was originally set to run for only four issues, but was extended to 40 issues due to high demand. The last issue was released on January 1, 2009, and led into the first arc of the Sonic Universe series. The comics were written by Ian Flynn, who also authored the main comic series. Some issues were published in Jetix Magazine in the United Kingdom, Italy and Poland.

While the comics are set during the Sonic X timeline, their plot is original. Eggman imprisons humans inside robots and tries to use them to kill the animals, but the animals destroy the robots. Eggman uses malicious Chao to destroy Station Square, but Tikal and Chaos arrive from the past, return the Chao to normal, and bring them back to the past. Soon, Sonic finds a machine in the desert and thinks nothing of it, but after fighting with Eggman in Paris and a bizarre world created by the doctor, Eggman reveals the desert machine was his and it begins to wreck Station Square. Sonic defeats it, but he is accused of working with Eggman, so he and Eggman are both locked up. Nelson bails Sonic out of jail, and he saves Cream and Chris from some ghosts.

Eggman enacts more malicious schemes based on holidays like Christmas, Valentine's Day and St. Patrick's Day. Afterwards, he temporarily fires Decoe and Bocoe and creates replacements, Dukow and Bukow, who kidnap Sonic and give him to an organization called S.O.N.I.C.X. Sonic escapes with ease, but S.O.N.I.C.X. repeatedly tries to ruin his reputation. Meanwhile, the animals take on Eggman in his various schemes—including becoming a wrestler and creating a circus—to keep the Emeralds from him. In the final issue, a crossover with the continuity of the main comic series, that continuity's Metal Sonic appears and allies with Eggman to defeat Sonic, but that continuity's version of Shadow steps in and warps himself and Metal Sonic to another dimension, leading into the events of the first issue of Sonic Universe.

Video games 
In 2003, McDonald's packaged five different single-button dedicated console games, mostly based on various sports, with Happy Meals to promote Sonic X: two featuring Sonic and one each for Tails, Knuckles, and Shadow. Another Happy Meal game based on Big the Cat fishing arrived the following year.

LeapFrog Enterprises released a Sonic X educational math game for its Leapster handheld game console; it was released in 2005 in North America and 2007 in Europe. The game stars Sonic and Chris, who must rescue Tails, Amy, and Knuckles from Eggman. It is a fast-paced platform/action game in which Sonic runs and jumps through levels and destroys Eggman's robots along the way. Periodically, Sonic must answer math questions to continue. The game features three levels, each with its own math concepts: the city Station Square (sequencing, counting in increments); Angel Island, the home of the Master Emerald (addition), and Eggman's base (subtraction). There are also math-based minigames unrelated to the levels to supplement these skills.

Trading card game 
Score Entertainment created a Sonic X collectible card game for two players released in 2005. Players battle for Chaos Emeralds, whoever gets three first wins. Each turn, both players lay out five cards face-down and flip over one at a time; whichever card has a lower number value is eliminated. Eliminating the other player's cards and combining the special abilities of one's own cards allows one to score rings; whichever player has the most rings at the end of the turn wins an Emerald. As the game does not emphasize collecting rare cards, a few booster packs are enough to build a competent deck. KidzWorld gave a positive review, praising its ease of learning, low cost, and inherent strategy, but also noting that it feels more like a generic card game with Sonic characters than like a wholly Sonic-based product.

Reception 
Sonic X received divided reviews. Many reviewers were critical of its American localization. Conrad Zimmerman of Destructoid cited Sonic X "horrible localization" as a main reason for negativity. Tim Jones of THEM Anime gave the show two stars out of five and criticized the English voice acting: "It's really annoying how all the recent Sonic games use these untalented actors/actresses in their dubs, because they make the original English voices sound like award-winning performers." Other comments on the show's aesthetics were mostly positive. Staff of GamesRadar admitted, "At least the song fits. Can't imagine Sonic listening to Undergrounds wailing Meat Loaf light rock, but he'd definitely jam to Sonic X." Jones praised the rock music from Sonic Adventure 1 and 2, as well as the "pretty piano music" and "catchy" Japanese intro and outro themes. He also found the backgrounds "nice to look at" but did not like the use of CGI for Sonic's homing attack.

The human characters and, to a lesser extent, the animal ones were also criticized. Jones described Chris as "a dull, boring, uninspired character" and also described Tanaka and Ella as "bland" stereotypes of Japanese and African-Americans, respectively. Jones also criticized the presence of Amy and Big, but took particular issue to the show's portrayal of Sonic, which he summarized as: I'm gonna run around downtown until something exciting happens and use a stinking Ring to defeat my enemies. GamesRadar bemoaned both the "piss-poor Adventure characters" and the original human ones. In contrast, writer Gaz Plant of NintendoLife opined that "one of the key successes" of the series was its incorporation of numerous characters from the games, including lesser-used ones like Big and the Chaotix. Fans were divided on the merit of the Thorndykes.

The show was praised for its faithfulness to the games. Famitsu offered a uniformly positive review before the first episode broadcast in 2003, commending the skillful transition of the games' speed and style to animation, and expected the series to continue to grow more interesting. Plant stated that "where Sonic X truly succeeded was in its retelling of iconic stories." Independent of the characters involved, GamesRadar appreciated the idea of following "Sonic's core concept." The original storylines were also praised. Amidst his criticism of most of the show, Jones praised the first episode in general, especially its humor. Plant acclaimed the character development that built on the stories of the original games, especially Sonic and Amy's relationship and the Chaotix's newfound viability as comedy devices. Concurrently, he found the show "surprisingly touching," particularly in its "emotional" final climax, and favorably compared the space exploration of season three to Star Trek. Famitsus first preview called the story .

Common Sense Media gave it three stars out of five and, while not commenting further on its quality, stated that it was appropriate for grade-school children but that some violent scenes were inadvisable for younger viewers. A second Famitsu review from later in 2003 called the anime an outstanding success and encouraged readers to tune in.

Popularity and cultural impact 
The show was quite popular in the United States, France, Indonesia and Malaysia, consistently reaching the number-one position in its timeslot in both countries. By 2007, it was TMS' best-selling anime in the non-Japanese market, despite that the third season did not air in Japan until 2020, and it inspired TMS to focus on properties that would sell well outside Japan. In April 2009, a six-year-old Norwegian boy named Christer pressed his parents to send a letter to King Harald V of Norway to approve his name being changed to "Sonic X". They allowed Christer to write it himself but did not send it until he badgered them further, and the king responded that he could not approve the change because Christer was not eighteen years old. Extending over a decade past the show's initial release, the show has spawned internet memes and the phrase "gotta go fast", the title of the song that plays in the opening and closing sequence, has been used in the titles of video game periodical articles to represent the Sonic series and other fast-paced video games.

Soundtrack 

Sonic X: Original Soundtrack is the soundtrack to the series of same name. It was released in Japan on March 3, 2004, by Wave Master Entertainment.
 
 Track list

References

External links 

 Official Sonic Team website 
 Official TMS Entertainment website  
 Official TV Tokyo website 
 Official TMS Entertainment website 
 
 Sonic X at Absolute Anime
 
 
 Official Discotek Media website

2003 American television series debuts
2003 Japanese television series debuts
2003 anime television series debuts
2004 Japanese television series endings
2005 Japanese novels
2006 American television series endings
2006 Japanese novels
2007 Japanese novels
4Kids Entertainment
Adventure anime and manga
Animated series based on Sonic the Hedgehog
Animated television series about children
Animated television series about hedgehogs
Anime and manga about parallel universes
Anime television series based on video games
Comics based on Sonic the Hedgehog
Cyborgs in television
Discotek Media
Funimation
Japanese children's animated action television series
Japanese children's animated adventure television series
Japanese children's animated comic science fiction television series
Japanese children's animated science fantasy television series
Science fiction anime and manga
TMS Entertainment
TV Tokyo original programming
Television censorship in the United States
Television series about parallel universes
Television series about the Moon